Protestantism is one of the six approved religions in Indonesia, the others being Islam, Roman Catholicism, Hinduism, Buddhism, and Confucianism. It constitutes the bulk of Christianity in Indonesia, which is the second largest religion in the country after Islam. According to CIA statistic, in 2000 5.7% of the population of Indonesia were Protestant. A nationwide census of 2018 noted that 7.6% (20,250,000) of the population considering themselves Protestant, largest in Southeast Asia.

Protestantism is largely a result of Calvinist (Reformed) and Lutheran missionary efforts during the country's colonial period. The Dutch East India Company regulated the missionary work so it could serve its own interests and restricted it to the eastern part of the Indonesian archipelago. Although these two branches are the most common, a multitude of other denominations can be found elsewhere in Indonesia. The Batak Protestant Christian Church, founded in 1861 by German Lutheran missionary Ludwig Ingwer Nommensen, is the largest one.

History 
Protestantism arrived in Indonesia during the Dutch East Indies colonization. By the mid-1700s a significant Lutheran presence was found in Jakarta, with a Lutheran church built by the Lutheran Governor General Gustaaf Willem van Imhoff in 1749.  In 1817, the Dutch founded the Protestantsche Kerk in Nederlandsch-Indie ("Indische Kerk") as a union of Reformed, Lutheran, Baptists, Arminian and Mennonite denominations.  In 1835, the Dutch king decreed that one church council would fuse and oversee the Protestant denominations in the Dutch colony.

Demographics 

On the island of Sulawesi, 17% of the citizens are Protestants, particularly in Tana Toraja and North Sulawesi. Up to 65% of the Torajan population are Protestant. In some parts of the country, entire villages belong to a distinct denomination, such as Adventist, Lutheran, Presbyterian or Salvation Army. Two provinces have Protestant majorities: North Sulawesi (64%) and Papua (60%). Christian Evangelical Church in Minahasa is the largest Protestant church in North Sulawesi. Gereja Injili di Tanah Jawa is a Mennonite-related denomination. Huria Kristen Batak Protestant is a Lutheran denomination founded by Ludwig Ingwer Nommensen. It is the largest Protestant denomination in Indonesia and has over 4 million congregants.  The relatively large number of "denominations" per capita in Indonesia may be due to the significant number of different ethnic groups in Indonesia. Many Indonesian Protestants tend to congregate based more on ethnicity than liturgical differences.

Reformed denominations 

The Reformed faith brought by Dutch missionaries in the 17th century. Many of these churches are members of the World Communion of Reformed Churches:
 Christian Evangelical Church in Sangihe-Talaud (GMIST)
 Christian Evangelical Church in Minahasa (GMIM)
 Christian Church in East Timor
 Christian Church in Luwuk Banggai
 Christian Church in Central Sulawesi
 Christian Church of Southern Sumatra
 Christian Church of Sumba
 Church of Toraja Mamasa
 East Java Christian Church
 Evangelical Christian Church in Halmahera
 Evangelical Christian Church in Papua
 Evangelical Church in Bolaang Mongondow
 Evangelical Church in Kalimantan
 Indonesian Christian Church
 Indonesian Protestant Church in Buol Toli-Toli
 Indonesian Protestant Church in Donggala
 Indonesian Protestant Church in Gorontalo
 Javanese Christian Church (Sinode Gereja-gereja Kristen Jawa, GKJ)
 Karo Batak Protestant Church
 Pasundan Christian Church
 Protestant Christian Church in Bali
 Protestant Church in Indonesia
 Protestant Church of Maluku
 Protestant Church in Southeast Sulawesi
 Protestant Church in West Indonesia
 Protestant Evangelical Church in Timor
 Toraja Church

Members of the International Conference of Reformed Churches 
Gereja-Gereja Reformasi Calvinis
Gereja-Gereja Reformasi di Indonesia

Members of World Reformed Fellowship 
Reformed Evangelical Church in Indonesia

Lutheran denominations 

Indonesian churches recognized by the Lutheran World Federation as Lutheran or affiliated with Lutheran are:
 Banua Niha Keriso Protestan (BNKP) – The Protestant Church in Nias Island
 Gereja Angowuloa Masehi Indonesia Nias (AMIN) – Christian Communion of Indonesia in Nias
 Gereja Kristen Luther Indonesia (GKLI) – Indonesian Christian Lutheran Church
 Gereja Kristen Protestan Angkola (GKPA) – Christian Protestant Angkola Church
 Gereja Kristen Protestan di Mentawai (GKPM) – Protestant Christian Church in Mentawai
 Gereja Kristen Protestan Indonesia (GKPI) – Christian Protestant Church in Indonesia
 Gereja Kristen Protestan Pakpak Dairi (GKPPD) – Pakpak Dairi Protestant Christian Church
 Gereja Kristen Protestan Simalungun (GKPS) – Simalungun Protestant Christian Church
 Gereja Punguan Kristen Batak (GPKB) – Batak Christian Community Church
 Gereja Protestan Persekutuan (GPP) – The United Protestant Church
 Huria Kristen Batak Protestan (HKBP) – Protestant Christian Batak Church
 Huria Kristen Indonesia (HKI) – The Indonesian Christian Church
 Orahua Niha Keriso Protestan (ONKP) - Communion of Protestant Christian Church

HKI, GMB, GKPS, GKPI, GKLI, GKPA, GPP, and GKPPD all split from HKBP.  GKLI maintains a strong relationship with the Norwegian Lutheran Church. GKPM was founded by HKBP missionaries.  Although the BNKP and HKBP have historically cooperated, no official relationship exists between those entities. AMIN split from BNKP and retains more of a Lutheran identity.

Gereja Lutheran Indonesia (GLI) is affiliated with the Confessional Evangelical Lutheran Conference. GLI is closely associated with the Wisconsin Evangelical Lutheran Synod in the United States. GLI has offices in Jakarta and operates a seminary, Sekolah Tinggi Teologi Lutheran (STTL), in Yogyakarta. GLI has large congregations on Java and in West Timor, as well as posts in Papua and Kalimantan.

See also 
Christianity in Indonesia
Religion in Indonesia
Christianity among the Batak
Pentecostal Church in Indonesia
Protestantism by country

References

Further reading

External links 

 
Indonesia
History of the Dutch East India Company

de:Christentum in Indonesien#Protestantismus